Chris Stout (born 1976) is a Scottish fiddle/violin player from Shetland, now based in Glasgow. Stout grew up in Fair Isle and lived there until 8 years of age before moving to Sandwick on the Shetland Mainland, then on to Glasgow in the 1990s.

Stout has studied under prominent Shetland fiddlers including Willie Hunter and Arthur Scott Robertson and is adept at a variety of violin styles, drawing on a range of influences from folk, jazz, electronica and classical.

In 1990 he won both the Shetland "Young Fiddler of the Year" competition for his skills as a traditional fiddle player and the Shetland "Young Musician of the Year" competition for his classical violin abilities.

In 2015, Hirda, A New Opera for Shetland, co-composed with Irish composer, Gareth Williams and produced by NOISE, toured Shetland and performed in Glasgow and Edinburgh

Education
 Fair Isle primary school, Shetland
 Dunrossness Primary, Shetland
 Sandwick school, Shetland
 Anderson High School, Shetland
 Douglas Academy music school, Glasgow
 Royal Scottish Academy of Music and Drama (RSAMD), Glasgow (attained a degree in classical violin)
  Royal Scottish Academy of Music and Drama (RSAMD), Glasgow (attained a master's degree in electro-acoustic music)

Discography

Solo albums
 First O' the Darkenin (2004)
 Devil's Advocate (2007)

Groups and collaborations

 ó, Beaglaoich S, Catriona McKay, and Chris Stout. Begley, Mckay, Stout., 2014. Sound recording.
 Fiddlers' Bid – Around the World (1994)
 Fiddlers' Bid – Hamnataing (1998)
 DJ Trevor Reilly – Down with the Underground, and mix by Judge Jules (1998)
 Various – Big Sky (1999)
 Finlay MacDonald – Finlay MacDonald (2000)
 The Clydesiders – Crossing the Borders (2000)
 Keltic Electrik (2000)
 Duncan McCrone – Just a Glasgow Boy (2001)
 Dean Owens – "Anything" (CD single) (2001)
 Fiddlers' Bid – Da Farder den Da Welcomer (2002)
 Annie Whitehead and Alistair Anderson – Northern Lights (2002)
 Catriona McKay – Catriona McKay (2002)
 Finlay MacDonald Band – Pressed for Time (2003)
 Salsa Celtica – El Agua De La Vida (2003)
 Kevin Mackenzie's Vital Signs – Another New Horizon (2004)
 Blair Douglas – Angles from the Ashes (2004)
 Joseph Malik – Aquarius Songs (2004)
 Yvonne Lyon – Fearless (2005)
 Duncan McCrone – All You Need to Know (2005)
 The Unusual Suspects – Live in Scotland (2005)
 Catriona McKay and Chris Stout – Laebrack (2005)
 Fiddlers' Bid – Naked and Bare (2005)
 Christianne Neves – Duas Madrugadas (2005)
 Salsa Celtica – El Camino (2006)
 Finlay MacDonald Band – Re-Echo (2007)
 Yvonne Lyon – A Thousand Questions Why (2007)
 Lise Sinclair – Ivver Enchantin Wis (2007)
 The Macdonald Bros (2007)
 Fiddlers' Bid – All Dressed in Yellow (2009)
 Catriona McKay & Chris Stout - White Nights (2010)
 Chris Stout's Brazilian Theory Live in Concert (2011)
 Brend Works (2012)
 Kyle Carey - North Star (2014)
 Catriona McKay & Chris Stout - White Nights (2010)
 Chris Stout & Catriona McKay, Scottish Ensemble - Seavaigers (2014)
 Chris Stout & Catriona McKay - Bare Knuckle (2017)

As a producer
 Tommy O'Sullivan – Songs Ablaze (2006)
 Lauren MacColl – When Leaves Fall (2007)

References

External links
 http://www.chrisstout.co.uk
 http://www.fiddlersbid.com
 https://web.archive.org/web/20081210232641/http://www.shetland-music.com/prominent_artists/artistes/christopher_stout/

Scottish fiddlers
British male violinists
People from Fair Isle
Shetland music
Living people
1976 births
Shetland fiddlers
21st-century violinists
21st-century British male musicians